Raleigh is an unincorporated community in Meriwether County, in the U.S. state of Georgia.

History
The community was named after Raleigh Bowden. A post office called Raleigh was established in 1887, and remained in operation until 1957. Raleigh was an incorporated municipality from 1925 until 1995.

References

Former municipalities in Georgia (U.S. state)
Unincorporated communities in Meriwether County, Georgia
Unincorporated communities in Georgia (U.S. state)
Populated places disestablished in 1995